Northeast Region may be:
Northeast Region (Boy Scouts of America)
List of Missouri conservation areas – Northeast region
Northeast Region, Brazil
Northeastern United States
North-East Region, Singapore
Northeastern Statistical Region in North Macedonia
Northeast India
Northeast (Vietnam)
Northeastern United States (disambiguation)